Jefferson and His Time is a six-volume biography of US President Thomas Jefferson by American historian Dumas Malone, published between 1948 and 1981. His work on the series gave Malone a reputation as "the world's leading Jefferson scholar". For the fifth volume, he was awarded the 1975 Pulitzer Prize for History.

Volumes 
The six volumes were published individually as follows:
Jefferson the Virginian (1948)
Jefferson and the Rights of Man (1951)
Jefferson and the Ordeal of Liberty (1962)
Jefferson the President: First Term, 1801–1805 (1970)
Jefferson the President: Second Term, 1805–1809 (1974)
The Sage of Monticello (1981)

References 

1948 non-fiction books
1951 non-fiction books
1962 non-fiction books
1970 non-fiction books
1974 non-fiction books
1981 non-fiction books
American biographies
Books about Thomas Jefferson
History books about the American Revolution
Pulitzer Prize for History-winning works
Multi-volume biographies
Biographies about politicians
University of Virginia Press books
Book series introduced in 1948
Books about Virginia